James Wilson (2 October 1891 – 1973) was a Scottish long-distance runner who specialised in the 10,000 metres. He competed for Great Britain at the 1920 Summer Olympics and won a bronze medal in the 10,000 metres, five seconds behind Paavo Nurmi; Wilson beat Nurmi by some 5 seconds in the heats. He finished fourth in the individual 8,000 m cross-country race, again behind Nurmi, but won a silver medal with the British team. Nationally Wilson won Scottish titles over 4 miles in 1914–20 and over 10 miles in 1920.

James and his twin brother John were the youngest of five children of Isabella and Robert Wilson, Scottish migrant workers in England. His father was a herdsman from Aberdeenshire. James and John were inspired to join the local athletics club by watching the 1908 Olympic marathon race that passed nearby their home. Later, when World War I broke out, John enlisted to the army and died from peritonitis in 1916, while James stayed at home earning his living as a metalworker. After the 1920 Olympics he found a job as mechanical engineer at the Neasden Power Station, which provided electricity to the Metropolitan Railways, and semi-retired from running. He resumed competing in 1923, when he joined Surrey Athletic Club, but never regained his past shape and retired for good in 1925.

Wilson was married to Annie Williams. He died from a bowel cancer aged 81–82.

References

1891 births
1973 deaths
Sportspeople from Greenock
Scottish Olympic medallists
Scottish male long-distance runners
English male long-distance runners
Olympic athletes of Great Britain
Olympic silver medallists for Great Britain
Olympic bronze medallists for Great Britain
Athletes (track and field) at the 1920 Summer Olympics
International Cross Country Championships winners
Medalists at the 1920 Summer Olympics
Olympic silver medalists in athletics (track and field)
Olympic bronze medalists in athletics (track and field)
Olympic cross country runners
Sportspeople from Windsor, Berkshire